Nueva Germania (New Germania) is a district of San Pedro Department in Paraguay. It was founded as a German settlement on 23 August 1887 by Bernhard Förster, a German nationalist, who was married to Elisabeth Förster-Nietzsche, sister of the German philosopher Friedrich Nietzsche. Förster's idea was to create a model community in the New World and to demonstrate the supremacy of German culture and society. Förster committed suicide after the settlement's initial failure.

It is located about 297 kilometres from Asunción, capital of the Republic of Paraguay.

History 
Nueva Germania was founded in 1886 on the banks of the Aguaray-Guazú River, about 250 kilometres from Asunción by five, later fourteen, largely impoverished families from Saxony. Led by Bernhard Förster and his wife, Elisabeth Förster-Nietzsche, the German colonists emigrated to the Paraguayan rainforest to put to practice utopian ideas about the superiority of the Aryan race. It was the declared dream of Förster to create an area of Germanic development, far from the influence of Jews, whom he reviled. 

The colony's development was hampered by the harshness of the environment, a lack of proper supplies and an overconfidence of the colonist's own supposed Aryan supremacy. Most settlers soon died of starvation and disease. Those who survived malaria and the sand-flea infections rushed to flee Nueva Germania. Those who stayed, convinced of their founder's teachings, married among themselves so as to preserve the racial stock.

Förster, who had negotiated the town's titles of property with General Bernardino Caballero, committed suicide in 1889 in the city of San Bernardino after abandoning the settlers.  Elisabeth Förster-Nietzsche returned to Germany in 1893.

According to Gerard L. Posner, writing in Mengele: The Complete Story, Josef Mengele, a major German war criminal, spent some time in Nueva Germania while he was a fugitive after World War II. However, the evidence that Mengele ever passed through is shaky at best.
Nueva Germania became a quiet community in San Pedro, dedicated to agriculture and specializing in the cultivation of yerba mate. Beginning in 2004 the American writer David Woodard embarked on a series of expeditions to the erstwhile colony.
As of 2013 pockets of German culture remained. Most of the population in the area still speak a mixture of German and Guaraní.

Immigration increased in 2021, fueled by fears including vaccination.

Economy 

One of the most important products of the district is yerba mate, along with sugarcane, cotton, manioc (cassava), tobacco, sunflower, soy, wheat, banana, sweet and sour orange, Paraguayan lemon verbena and sesame.

Transportation 
A branch of Route No. 3 General Elizardo Aquino, a paved road, is the main access to the town, which connects it with Asunción and other localities of the department. Also, Route No. 11 Juana Maria de Lara, an unpaved road, connects the town with the Amambay Department.

Other unimproved roads (of sand or pebbles) connect with different districts and the capital of the department.

Climate 
The climate is tropical, with abundant rains, a maximum temperature of about 35 °C, a minimum of 10 °C and an average of 23 °C, with a humidity of 80%. Precipitation exceeds 1300 millimeters, especially in summer.

Language 
About 80 percent of the population speak the Guaraní language. The rest speak a combination of German and Spanish.

Population 

The General Directorate of Statistics, Polls and Census has reported the following:

 In 1992 the district had 17,148 inhabitants, the majority of whom lived in the town of Santa Rosa del Aguaray. In 2002 Santa Rosa del Aguaray became a municipality in its own right. Consequently, the District of Nueva Germania lost most of its population and territory, though it retained the Mennonite colony Rio Verde to the north of Santa Rosa del Aguaray.
 The population is mostly rural and occupied in agricultural activities.
 The projected net population by gender for 2002 was 4,335 inhabitants (2,323 men and 2,012 women).

As of 2002, about 10 per cent of Nueva Germania's inhabitants were of mainly German origin.

Borders 
Nueva Germania borders on

 Tacuatí district to the north;
 Lima district to the south, separated from it for the Aguaray Guazú River;
 Amambay department and the Santa Rosa del Aguaray district to the east;
 San Pedro de Ycuamandiyú district and the Tacuati district to the west..

Hydrography 
Nueva Germania district is watered by the rivers Aguaray Guazú and Aguaray mí, and the streams Tutytí and Empalado.

Demographics 
Main social and demographic indicators:

 Total fertility rate: 3.4
 Percentage of illiteracy in the district: 15.4%
 Percentage of housings that have power: 82.0%
 Percentage of housings that have running water: 39.6%
 Percentage of population that are under the age of 15: 39%
 Percentage of population that have access to modern housing: 41.2%
 Percentage of population that have access to modern sanitation: 20.9%
 Percentage of population that have access to modern educational programs: 13.5%
 Percentage of population that are employed in the primary sector of the economy: 60.1%
 Percentage of population that are employed in the secondary sector of the economy: 14.3%
 Percentage of population that are employed in the tertiary sector of the economy: 25.0%

See also 
 Germans in Paraguay
 El Paraíso Verde, a 21st-century private colony established in Paraguay by German-speaking emigrants

References

External links and further reading 
 Ben Macintyre, Forgotten Fatherland: The Search for Elisabeth Nietzsche, New York: Farrar Straus Giroux 1992, reissued as Forgotten Fatherland: The True Story of Nietzsche's Sister and Her Lost Aryan Colony, Broadway 2011  
 New York Times article on Nueva Germania, 1991
 New York Times article on Nueva Germania, 2013
 Brochure by the Protestant Parish of Dueren (in German), contains pictures
 Blog on Nueva Germania with photos
 World Gazeteer: Paraguay – World-Gazetteer.com
 Dialog International — "Dick Cheney and Nueva Germania"
  (article deleted)
 The Walrus article has been deleted, but has been reproduced in this Wordpress blog
 Kraus, Daniela, Bernhard und Elisabeth Försters Nueva Germania in Paraguay. Eine antisemitische Utopie. PhD Thesis. University of Vienna. 1999
 Kurzwelly, Jonatan. Being German and Being Paraguayan in Nueva Germania: Arguing for “Contextual Epistemic Permissibility” and “Methodological Complementarity.” PhD Thesis. University of St Andrews. 2017
 Kurzwelly, Jonatan (2019), "Being German, Paraguayan and Germanino: Exploring the Relation Between Social and Personal Identity" in Identity: An International Journal of Theory and Research, 2/2019. doi:10.1080/15283488.2019.1604348
 Sussman, Nadia and Simon Romero, 2013, "A Lost Colony in Paraguay" Video: "A Lost Tribe in Paraguay"

Utopian communities
Populated places in the San Pedro Department, Paraguay
Populated places established in 1888

Settlement schemes in Paraguay